The Kartika Wijaya, now éL Hotel Kartika Wijaya 
is a colonial-style hotel located in Batu, East Java. The address is at Jalan Panglima Sudirman 127. 

It was founded in 1891 by the Armenian Sarkies Brothers, who were also the founders of the Raffles Hotel in Singapore and the Eastern & Oriental Hotel in Penang.

Located around the hotel are various Hindu temples.

External links 
 Kartika Wijaya Homepage

Batu, East Java
Hotels in Indonesia
Buildings and structures in East Java